David Niblock (born 1981) is an Irish former Gaelic footballer who played for club side Nemo Rangers and at senior level for the Cork county team. He usually lined out in the forwards.

Career
Born in Cork, Niblock is the son of former Derry Gaelic footballer Mickey Niblock and a nephew of Hugh Niblock. He had underage success with the Nemo Rangers club before eventually joining the club's senior team. Over the course of 15 years he won nine County Senior Championship medals, while he was also a part of the club's All-Ireland Club Championship-winning team in 2003. Niblock also lined out in all grades with Cork. After provincial success at minor and under-21 levels he won a Munster Championship medal ain 2006. Niblock was a substitute when Cork were beaten by Kerry in the 2007 All-Ireland final.

Honours
Nemo Rangers
All-Ireland Senior Club Football Championship: 2003
Munster Senior Club Football Championship: 2000, 2001, 2002, 2005, 2007, 2010
Cork Senior Football Championship: 2000, 2001, 2002, 2005, 2006, 2007, 2008, 2010, 2015

Cork
Munster Senior Football Championship: 2006
Munster Under-21 Football Championship: 2001
Munster Minor Football Championship: 1999

References

1981 births
Living people
Cork inter-county Gaelic footballers
Nemo Rangers Gaelic footballers
David